If I Fall may refer to:

 If I Fall, If I Die, a 2015 novel by Michael Christie

Songs 
 "If I Fall" (Tara MacLean song), 1999
 "If I Fall", by Amber Pacific from The Possibility and the Promise, 2005
 "If I Fall", by Cole Plante, 2014
 "If I Fall", by Doc Walker from Go, 2009
 "If I Fall", by Five Finger Death Punch from American Capitalist, 2011
 "If I Fall", by Nick Jonas from Spaceman, 2021
 "If I Fall", by The Story So Far from Proper Dose, 2018

See also
 "If I Fall You're Going Down with Me", a 1999 song by Dixie Chicks
 "If I Fell", a 1964 song by The Beatles 
 If I Should Fall (disambiguation)